Reidland High School was a public secondary school (grades 9–12) located in Paducah, Kentucky. Its mascot was the Greyhound, and its school colors were red and white. The school closed in 2013 with the consolidation of the three high schools in the McCracken County Public Schools (MCPS) district into a new McCracken County High School.

State champions
 Girls Golf: 1996, 1997 (Individual: Susan Loyd)
 Girls Tennis Singles: Jackie Trail (1994, 1995)
 Softball: 1995, 2002, 2010
2004 Kapos Cheerleading State Champions

Notable alumni
Michael Adams, Kentucky politician
Trevor Mann, professional wrestler best known as Ricochet, and in Lucha Underground as Prince Puma

References

Defunct schools in Kentucky
Public high schools in Kentucky
Schools in McCracken County, Kentucky
Educational institutions disestablished in 2013
2013 disestablishments in Kentucky